Saeed Anwar (born 12 December 1978) is a Pakistani first-class cricketer who plays for Khan Research Laboratories.

References

External links
 

1978 births
Living people
Pakistani cricketers
Khan Research Laboratories cricketers
Cricketers from Burewala
Gazi Tank cricketers
Multan cricketers
Rawalpindi cricketers
Water and Power Development Authority cricketers
Punjab (Pakistan) cricketers